The Heart of Illinois Conference was Central Illinois based high school athletic conference in the Illinois High School Association (IHSA) between 1972 and 1978.

History
The conference was formed in 1972 out of members of the Corn Belt Conference along with Canton, Illinois Valley Central, Metamora, Morton, Washington, and (newly established) Stanford Olympia high schools. In the 1972 and 1973 football seasons the conference was divided into east and west divisions. The east division was composed of Bloomington Central Catholic, Clinton, Normal U-High, Pontiac, and Stanford Olympia. The west division included Canton, Chillicothe IVC, Metamora, Morton, and Washington. The divisions were discontinued after IHSA state football playoffs started in 1974. The conference split apart after the 1977-78 school year with many members reincorporating the Corn Belt Conference.

Member schools

References

External links

Illinois high school sports conferences
Education in McLean County, Illinois